Benteng Pendem ("Sunken Fortress") refers to several Indonesian fortifications:
Benteng Pendem (Ngawi), in Ngawi, Indonesia
Benteng Pendem (Cilacap), in Cilacap, Indonesia